As Long as She Needs Me is a 1961 (see 1961 in music) album by Sammy Davis Jr., arranged by Marty Paich and Morty Stevens.

Track listing
 "As Long as She Needs Me" (Lionel Bart) – 3:07
 "Climb Ev'ry Mountain" (from The Sound of Music) (Richard Rodgers, Oscar Hammerstein II) – 3:23
 "(Love Is) The Tender Trap" (Sammy Cahn, Jimmy Van Heusen) – 2:38
 "We Kiss in a Shadow" (from The King and I) (Rodgers, Hammerstein II) – 3:21
 "There Is Nothin' Like a Dame" (from South Pacific) (Rodgers, Hammerstein II) – 2:39
 "Song from Two for the Seesaw (A Second Chance)" (Dory Langdon, André Previn) – 2:59
 "Out of This World" (Harold Arlen, Johnny Mercer) – 3:21
 "Back in Your Own Back Yard" (Dave Dreyer, Al Jolson, Billy Rose) – 2:52
 "Bye Bye Blackbird" (Mort Dixon, Ray Henderson) – 2:49
 "Falling in Love With Love" (from The Boys from Syracuse) (Rodgers, Lorenz Hart) – 2:29
 "Step Out of That Dream" (Phil J. Tuminello, Florence Parker) – 2:32
 "There Was a Tavern in the Town" (Willam H. Hills) – 2:17

Personnel 
Recorded June, 1961:

Tracks 1-12

 Sammy Davis Jr. – vocals
 Marty Paich – arranger
 Morty Stevens – arranger

References

1961 albums
Sammy Davis Jr. albums
Reprise Records albums
Albums arranged by Marty Paich
Albums produced by Jimmy Bowen